Rock'n'roll for Princesses is a 1991 Soviet children's fantasy film directed by Radomir Vasilevsky, based on the book Tournament in the Kingdom of Fiofegas by Radiy Pogodin.

Plot
King of one fairy kingdom Philogerts (Viktor Pavlov) is concerned that his only son Prince Philotheus (Andrei Ankudinov) does not want to grow up. Then the king decides to get him married. To do this, he arranges a contest of princesses, the winner of which will become the wife of Philotheus. The court magician of the kingdom of Izmora (Grazhyna Baikshtite) helps to arrange the competition.

Cast
Grazhyna Baikshteit - Wizard of Izmora
Viktor Pavlov - King of the Philogenians
Andrey Ankudinov - Prince Philotheus
Svetlana Nemolyaeva - Queen (vocals - Larisa Dolina)
Lyudmila Arinina - teacher
Pavel Vinnik - teacher
Evgeny Gerchakov - educator
Vladimir Nosik - Lom, educator

References

External links

Russian children's fantasy films
Odesa Film Studio films
Soviet musical films
1990s musical films
Soviet children's films